Centro Desportivo da Madeira is a multi-use stadium in Ribeira Brava, Madeira, Portugal. It is used mostly for football matches. The stadium is able to hold 2,500 people and was built in 2007.

References

External links
 Municipality of Ribeira Brava
 Centro Desportivo da Madeira at ZeroZero

C.F. União
Football venues in Portugal
Sport in Madeira
Multi-purpose stadiums in Portugal
Buildings and structures in Madeira
Sports venues completed in 2007
2007 establishments in Portugal